James Idun (born 23 April 1963) is a Ghanaian sprinter. He competed in the men's 200 metres at the 1984 Summer Olympics.

References

1963 births
Living people
Athletes (track and field) at the 1984 Summer Olympics
Ghanaian male sprinters
Olympic athletes of Ghana
Place of birth missing (living people)
20th-century Ghanaian people